Curslack is a quarter of Hamburg, Germany, in the borough of Bergedorf. It is located in the eastern part of the borough, which lies in the southeast of Hamburg.

Name
The name derives from Cuwerslake, meaning low swampland, which is heavily exposed to flowing water. In Low German kuren means to seep and a Lake means a wet meadow. The area had been flooded regularly until the lock of Tatenberger Schleuse was built from 1949 to 1952.

Geography
Curslack borders the quarters of Bergedorf, Altengamme, Neuengamme and Allermöhe.

History
Curslack is part of the Vierlande area in Hamburg. The village was first recorded in 1188, when it formed a "dyke association" with neighboring Altengamme. In 1420 Curslack had been conquered by Hamburg and Lübeck. The village was under the administration of both cities (beiderstädtische Verwaltung) until 1868.

The church of St. John was first recorded in 1306. The actual church was built from 1599 to 1603. Curslack became part of Hamburg with the Greater Hamburg Act in 1937.

State owned Hamburg Wasser operates a waterworks in Curslack since 1928. Therefore, Curslack along with Altengamme were declared a "water protection zone" in 1997.

Politics
These are the results of Curslack in the Hamburg state election:

References

External links
 Curslack, Hamburg.de

Quarters of Hamburg
Bergedorf